Lee Min-hyuk (born November 3, 1993), better known as Minhyuk, is a South Korean singer and MC. He debuted in the South Korean boy group Monsta X, formed in 2015 through the Mnet's survival show No.Mercy under Starship Entertainment.

Early life and debut 
Lee Min-hyuk was born in Uijeongbu, Gyeonggi-do, South Korea on November 3, 1993.

Beginning in December 2014, he competed in the Mnet's survival show No.Mercy. In the finale of the show, he was the final member of the seven contestants confirmed to be debuting in Starship Entertainment's new boy group Monsta X.

Career

2015–2018: Monsta X and career beginnings 
In May 2015, Minhyuk debuted with Monsta X, with their first EP Trespass.

In October 2018, Minhyuk is a credited writer for their song "널하다" ("I Do Love U"), from Monsta X's second studio album Take.1 Are You There?.

2019–present: MC roles and solo work 
In June 2019 he released a mixtape single "옹심이" ("Ongsimi"), with a music video released through Starship Entertainment's YouTube channel. The single featured his fellow group member Joohoney, and was described by Minhyuk as "EDM Hip Trot".

Beginning late 2019, Minhyuk began expanding his individual activities, including being part of the three MCs for SBS's Inkigayo, alongside Naeun and Jaehyun, hosting the show weekly every Sunday, starting in October.

For Monsta X's sixth studio album All About Luv, he is a credited writer and composer on three of their tracks.

In July 2020, Minhyuk launched the Vogue Ship Show on Naver Now, a weekly radio show that focuses on creating art while connecting with fans. Most episodes host guests, usually other idols, including members of g.o.d., labelmates such as Jeong Se-woon, and members of Cravity, as well as group members from Monsta X. 

In August, it was announced that he would be featured on the soundtrack for She's My Type, released through Daum. The song "Have a Goodnight", was released on September 11, as a duet with group member Shownu. Minhyuk was also announced as MC for the new KT Seezn program Back to the Idol, alongside Eunhyuk.

In November, he appeared on King of Mask Singer with the identity of "Baepsae", winning the first two rounds he competed in, but losing in the third round.

In June 2021, Minhyuk and Hyungwon appeared as part of the cast for the Youtube channel Inssa Oppa. The two played different "sub-characters" for each episode to introduce the latest trends and G-Market global shop products.

In July, he also joined the cast of the variety show Our Neighborhood Class as the youngest member. The show focused on the "makeover" of neighborhoods across the country, as well as returning for the second season of Back to the Idol, which began airing in mid-August, with Eunhyuk.

In March 2022, Minhyuk and Hyungwon returned in the sixth season of Inssa Oppa. For the concept of this season, these two will move freely to any desired time, such as the past, present, and future, under the concept of "what if" and perform situational plays on various themes. On March 15, he went to the Valentino Beauty's launch event pop-up store in Seoul. Minhyuk tested positive for COVID-19 on March 31. 

On August 25, he visited the Montblanc's pop-up store in Seoul, which was held under the brand's global campaign "On The Move".

On September 6, Minhyuk will return for the second season of Vogue Ship Show on Naver Now.

On October 14, he and Leeseo of Ive attended the premium American ice cream brand Häagen-Dazs' special exhibition "Melting Point", in collaboration with Lotte Department Store, held in Seoul.

On November 28, Minhyuk alongside celebrities, such as Kim Da-mi, Lee Joo-myung, and Irene Kim, attended the Fendi's special collection pop-up store, to commemorate the 25th anniversary of the baguette bag, held in Seoul.

In February 2023, he and Hyungwon attended the home appliance brand Dyson Style Lab pop-up store's opening ceremony, held in Seoul.

On March 20, Minhyuk decorated the cover of lifestyle and fashion magazine Singles Koreas April issue.

Personal life 
Minhyuk will enlists for his mandatory military service as an active duty soldier on April 4, 2023.

Public image and impact 
Minhyuk, as an individual and a member of Monsta X, showed a heavy presence within the group with his delicate appearance and soft voice that caught the eye at once, and shows a higher level of performance through steady efforts, making a mark on music fans. Based on his bright personality, he took on the role of "vitamin" for the team, further strengthening the teamwork of the group. He gradually expanded his activities outside the group and established himself as a "trend" in the broadcasting industry, and has been active as a "scene stealer" between stages with his pleasant hosting skills. He expanded his musical realm and received rave reviews from the prominent American business magazine Forbes, making him active as an irreplaceable "all-round entertainer".

Other ventures

Ambassadorship 
In November 2021, as part of Monsta X's promotional campaign for traditional Korean culture, Minhyuk and Hyungwon participated in a video narration for the YouTube series Kimchi Universe 3, jointly produced by Daesang Jonggajib and World Kimchi Research Institute together with Professor Seo Kyung-duk of Sungshin Women's University. The video explains how kimchi became known all over the world through the 1986 Asian Games and 1988 Seoul Olympics, culminating with Gimjang, the traditional practice of preparing and preserving kimchi, being registered on the UNESCO Intangible Cultural Heritage of Humanity in 2013.

Arts and photography 
In 2016, Minhyuk alongside Kihyun held a special exhibition "Moment in November" at the Space Art 1 in Jung-gu, Seoul from November 26 to 27. Under the theme of "moment", this exhibition consists of Kihyun's photos and Minhyuk's calligraphy and drawings. A space was also prepared for them to see the before and after Monsta X's debut photos, undisclosed polaroids, childhood photos, their cherished items, as well as events for fans, due to the warm response from domestic and foreign fans, and to repay the support they showed during the group's activities.

In 2022, Minhyuk works for the album artwork of Monsta X's eleventh EP Shape of Love. He showed his affection for fans, by putting the words written by the fan cafe on the canvas, photos of the concert hall, and the memories of Monbebe in one place, as well as mobilizing a photo book.

In 2023, Minhyuk held a collaborative exhibition with the street artist Doezny and the PepsiCo's carbonated soft drink brand Mountain Dew. Through this collaboration, the two artists recreated Mountain Dew into various graphic works such as posters, paintings, and digital art containing K-pop and street culture, which will be released as new content in the future in connection with the "2023 Mountain Dew Music Project".

Endorsements 
In July 2021, he became the global ambassador of the French premium mineral water brand Evian through the fashion magazine Esquire Koreas August cover issue. On July 16, Minhyuk and Shownu also appeared in the fashion magazine W Korea promoting the German premium luggage brand Rimowa. In August, he was chosen as global brand Korean muse for the American clothing brand Champion and will be part of the 2021 F/W pictorial.

In February 2022, Minhyuk became one of the faces of the Korean cosmetic and skincare brand Olive Young's Vegan Beauty campaign, along with group member Joohoney and his labelmate Liz of Ive. In April, he became the first muse for the Korean fashion shoes and accessories brand Shoopen. On July 7, Minhyuk became the new face and exclusive model in Korea and Japan for the skincare brand Floun. On November 16, he was selected as an advertising model of the American sports culture brand NFL's 2022 F/W season through the fashion magazine Dazed Korea, including its 2023 S/S collection. On November 28, the skincare brand Floun renewed Minhyuk's exclusive model contract.

In March 2023, he posted several photos with the luxury jewelry brand and specialty design house Tiffany & Co. on Instagram.

Philanthropy 
In November 2016, proceeds from the 2-days special exhibition "Moment in November" were donated in the names of Minhyuk, Kihyun, and fan club, Monbebe.

In April 2019, he donated to the Sokcho forest fire under the name of his fan club, Monbebe, as well as drew a relay donation from fans.

In November 2020, Minhyuk alongside Monbebe, donated ,933,113 to the international relief and development NGO Save the Children Korea, in commemoration of his birthday, and to help children suffering from COVID-19.

In November 2021, he donated 00,000 through the idol fandom community service My Favorite Idol, for his birthday. It will be delivered to the Miral Welfare Foundation and used as a fund for the disabled who are isolated due to COVID-19.

In October 2022, Minhyuk alongside celebrities, such as Park Bo-gum, Jung Hae-in, and Lee Se-young, agreed to wear grandma's handicraft brand Marco Rojo's products, such as rings and bracelets, which also advocates a social lifestyle brand, starting with the purpose of creating sustainable jobs for elderly women, who have reduced social participation, as well as having difficulties in becoming economically independent. On October 28, he attended in fashion magazine W Koreas breast cancer awareness campaign "Love Your W" charity event, alongside his group member Hyungwon, held at the Four Seasons Hotel in Gwanghwamun, Seoul.

In March 2023, Minhyuk participated in a charity auction of his cherished items, from paintings, custom bags, and rings, and all the proceeds will be donated.

Discography

Singles

As lead artist

Soundtrack appearances

Filmography

Television shows

Web shows

Awards and nominations

Notes

References

External links 

 

1993 births
21st-century South Korean  male singers
Living people
People from Uijeongbu
South Korean male idols
South Korean pop singers
Starship Entertainment artists
Monsta X members
Weekly Idol members
Japanese-language singers of South Korea
English-language singers from South Korea